The 2014 V.League 1 (known as the Eximbank V.League 1 for sponsorship reasons) season was the 58th season of the V.League 1, the highest division of Vietnamese football. The season began on 11 January 2014 and finished on 10 August 2014.

On August, Becamex Bình Dương clinched their third league title after a 1–1 draw against SHB Đà Nẵng.

Changes from last season

Team changes
The following teams have changed division since the 2013 season.

To V.League 1
Promoted from V.League 2
 Hùng Vương An Giang
 QNK Quảng Nam
 Than Quảng Ninh

From V.League 1
Folded
 Kienlongbank Kiên Giang

Relegated
 Xuân Thành Sài Gòn

Rule Changes
The Vietnam Football Federation passed a resolution on December 5 that stated only one club was to face relegation to the 2015 V.League 2 at the end of the 2014 campaign. Two clubs from the 2014 V.League 2 will be promoted to the 2015 V.League 1 campaign.

Teams
Of the 13 participating teams, ten remain following the 2013 V.League 1. They are joined by three teams promoted from the 2013 V.League 2. Kienlongbank Kiên Giang withdrew from the 2014 campaign, citing financial issues.

Match-fixing scandal
Ninh Bình wrote to the Vietnam Football Federation (VFF) and to the Vietnam Professional Football Joint Stock Company to be allowed to stop their participation in the league and also the AFC Cup due to 13 players being involved in match fixing. They had played 8 league matches and were third from bottom at the time. Following their withdrawal from the league, all their results were declared null and void.

Rule Changes
Due to the match fixing scandal and withdrawal of Ninh Bình, it was decided that the bottom-placed team at the end of the season will take part in a play-off match against the third-placed team in the First Division for the right to play in the V-League next season.

Stadium and locations

Sponsors of football teams

Managerial changes

Foreign players

Note:
1Those players who were born and started their professional career abroad but have since gained Vietnamese Residency;
2Vietnamese residents who have chosen to represent another national team

League table

Results

Summary

V.League 1 play-off

Season statistics

Top scorers

Hat-tricks

*: Scored four goals

Awards

Annual awards

Top scorer
 Hoàng Vũ Samson (Hà Nội T&T)

Manager of the Season
 Nguyễn Thanh Sơn (Becamex Bình Dương)

Best player of the Season
 Nguyễn Anh Đức (Becamex Bình Dương)

Best young player of the Season
 Trần Minh Vương (Hoàng Anh Gia Lai)

Best Referee
 Nguyễn Trọng Thư

Best Assistant Referee
 Phạm Mạnh Long

Dream Team

Team

References

External links
 Official Page

Vietnamese Super League seasons
Vietnam
Vietnam
1